Woolwich bombing may refer to:
Kings Arms, Woolwich bombing, 1974
1983 Royal Artillery Barracks bombing